Colletes fodiens is a Palearctic species of  plasterer bee.

References

External links
Images representing Colletes fodiens

Hymenoptera of Europe
Colletidae
Insects described in 1785